Spotswood High School may refer to:

 Spotswood High School (New Jersey), Spotswood, New Jersey
 Spotswood High School (Virginia), Penn Laird, Virginia